After the referendum on independence on 30 August 1999, East Timor became an independent nation on 20 May 2002 and began initiating foreign relations with the rest of the global community.

Policy
The foreign policy of East Timor has been defined by its position as a small state surrounded by two much larger powers. Rather than formally aligning with any particular state or bloc, East Timor has sought a diverse set of positive relationships. Upon independence foreign policy was shaped by José Ramos-Horta, who has previously campaigned internationally for East Timorese independence. Ramos-Horta was a proponent of Internationalism, and held sway until 2012. Following elections in 2012, leaders such as Xanana Gusmão and Taur Matan Ruak pursued a slightly more nationalistic foreign policy.

East Timor has pursued membership in a variety of multilateral forums, positioning itself as a reliable international actor. This promotion of international law is tied to the countries own security needs. Its broad global relations are shaped by its history, with its ties outside of its immediate region influenced by Catholicism, and by Portuguese colonial history. Regionally, its relations are influenced by cultural links to nearby regions, as well by the need to ensure security and independence in the light of the power imbalance between East Timor and its neighbours, Australia and Indonesia. Upon independence, it sought membership of ASEAN, despite historical ASEAN support of the Indonesian position and cultural links with Melanesia that were part of the East Timorese identity.

Relations with specific countries and regions

Association of Southeast Asian Nations 

East Timor is the only country in Southeast Asia neither a member of Association of Southeast Asian Nations (ASEAN) nor holding observer status in the group. However, East Timor has expressed its intention of gaining observer status to ASEAN in July 2002 and in 2006 it was considered six years to join. However, East Timor has attended many meetings of ASEAN regardless. In 2007 East Timor signed the ASEAN Treaty on Amity and Co-operation.
 
East Timor is a potential member of the East Asia Summit.

Bilateral relations

List of countries which Timor Leste maintains diplomatic relations with:

Participation in international organisations 
The country is an observer of the Association of Southeast Asian Nations (ASEAN) and the Pacific Alliance; and member of the International Bank for Reconstruction and Development (IBRD), International Monetary Fund (IMF), United Nations (UN), Asian Development Bank (ADB), Non-Aligned Movement (NAM) and the Community of Portuguese Language Countries (CPLP).

Although East Timor is not geographically part of Oceania, it also holds observer status in the Pacific Islands Forum, but does not seek full member status nor associate member status within the organisation, as it wishes to become a full member of the ASEAN.

International disputes 
East Timor-Indonesia Boundary Committee meets to survey and delimit land boundary; Indonesia seeks resolution of East Timorese refugees in Indonesia; Australia, East Timor, and Indonesia are working to resolve maritime boundary and sharing of seabed resources in the Timor Gap.

See also
 Foreign Aid to Timor Leste
 List of diplomatic missions in East Timor
 List of diplomatic missions of East Timor

Literature

References

External links 
 East Timor Ministry of Foreign Affairs
 Australian Embassy in East Timor
 Embassy of Brazil in Dili

 

de:Osttimor#Außenpolitik